Dave Finkel (born May 15, 1970) is an American television producer, actor, and screenwriter who has worked on many successful television shows. He often works with his screenwriting partner Brett Baer.

Writing work 

 New Girl (2011-2018)
 United States of Tara (2008-2011)
 30 Rock (2006)
 Joey (2005)
 The Norm Show
 Pinky and the Brain
 Duckman
 Animaniacs
 Ageo and York (Pilot)
 What They Play

External links

What They Play - Guitar Hero: The Encyclopedia of Rock

References

1970 births
American television writers
American male television writers
Living people
Male actors from Los Angeles
Writers Guild of America Award winners
Screenwriters from California